Antoinette Donnelly (1887–1964) was an American newspaper advice columnist and author of books about weight loss, beauty tips and advice. As Donnelly, she wrote the column Beauty Answers for the New York Daily News and other papers. She also wrote an advice column under the byline Doris Blake for 45 newspapers served by the Daily News and Chicago Tribune syndicate. In 1920, Donnelly wrote one of the first books about weight loss, the bestselling How to Reduce: New Waistlines for Old (D. Appleton & Company).

Just as columnists like Ann Landers and Abigail Van Buren would do later, "Doris Blake" had single issue booklets available to female readers who provided a self-addressed stamped envelope, ranging from Getting and Keeping Boys Interested to What About Petting? to How to Be Happy Though Married. She also served as a co-editor of the short-lived The Woman's Almanac. Donnelly retired from the Daily News at the end of 1962 and died in Greenwich, Connecticut, on November 15, 1964.

Sources
 Current Biography 1941, pp. 85–86
 https://thevintagewomanmagazine.com/1940s-self-care/

1887 births
1964 deaths
American advice columnists
American women columnists